Events from the year 1664 in Denmark.

Incumbents 

 Monarch - Frederick III

Events 

 22 April - The fortified town Frederiksodde is renamed Fredericia.

Undated
 Kommercekollegiet is established but later dissolved in the late 1680s before being reestablished in 1704.

Culture

Architecture
 Schackenborg Castle is constructed.
 Tødovre Church s constructed.

Births 
 3 February - Jens Bircherod, bishop (died 1720)
 24 August  Christen Thomesen Sehested, admiral (died 1736)

Full date unknown

Deaths 
 5 February   Christen Aagaard, poet (born 1616)

Full date unknown

References 

 
Denmark
Years of the 17th century in Denmark